Cymbiola deshayesi is a species of sea snail, a marine gastropod mollusk in the family Volutidae, the volutes.

Description

Distribution
Cymbiola deshayesi have been found in the waters surrounding several south-Pacific island groups. The current findings suggest a range from Pacific islands east of the Philippines to small island chains just off the coast of north-eastern Australia.

References

External links
 

Volutidae
Gastropods described in 1854